San Gregorio Magno alla Magliana Nuova is a church in Rome, in the Magliana district, in Piazza Certaldo.

Description
It was built in the twentieth century by the architect Aldo Aloysi. The church is located in an elevated position with respect to the square outside, and is accessed by a ladder on the left side. exposed totally built of reinforced concrete, the church is flanked by a high bell tower, which features a statue of Christ with outstretched arms.

The church is the home of the parish, established December 14, 1963 by decree of the Cardinal Vicar Clemente Micara "Neminem sane latet". The church is linked to the titular church of "St. Gregory the Great at Magliana Nuova", instituted by Pope John Paul II February 21, 2001.

On April 6, 2014 he received the visit of Pope Francis.

List of Cardinal Protectors
 Geraldo Majella Agnelo 21 February 2001 - present

References

External links
 San Gregorio Magno 

Titular churches
Rome Q. XI Portuense
20th-century Roman Catholic church buildings in Italy